Georg Sverdrup (born Jørgen Sverdrup; 25 April 1770 – 8 December 1850) was a Norwegian statesman, best known as one of the presidents  of the Norwegian Constituent Assembly in Eidsvoll in 1814. He was a member of the Norwegian Parliament and was also responsible for the development of the first Norwegian university library.

Biography
Georg Sverdrup was born in the fishing village of Laugen in Nærøy, Nord-Trøndelag, Norway. He was the uncle of brothers Harald Ulrik Sverdrup, who served as a member of  Norwegian Parliament, and Johan Sverdrup, who was the  Prime Minister of Norway. Georg Sverdrup, the  Norwegian-American Lutheran theologian, was his great-nephew.

Georg Sverdrup entered the University of Copenhagen during 1794 and graduated with a degree in philology in 1798. During the period 1798–1799, he studied at the University of Göttingen.

He represented Christiania at the Norwegian Constitutional Assembly during 1814 at Eidsvoll. He was the last president of the Assembly, chosen the second last day, 16 May. He led the election of the king and gave the closing speech. During the drafting of the Norwegian constitution, Sverdrup was one of the principle authors of the Jew clause, which prohibited Jews from entering Norway. He was later elected to the Norwegian Parliament in 1818 and 1824.

Sverdrup became professor of Greek at the University of Copenhagen in 1805. Sverdrup was librarian of the university library from 1813 to 1845. The University of Oslo was established in 1811 under the name Royal Frederick University, but due to the Napoleonic War it was not until 1815 that Sverdrup could receive the 50,000 volumes, then in Copenhagen, intended for the new university library. It took another year for the government to provide adequate localities for the collection, and not until 1828 was the library finally completed, with a total of 90,000 volumes.

Georg Sverdrup is buried at Vår Frelsers gravlund. Sverdrups gate in the district of  Grünerløkka in Oslo was named in his honor. The new university library at Blindern (Georg Sverdrups hus – Universitetsbibliotekets), finished in 1999, is named after Georg Sverdrup. It houses more than 2,000,000 books.

See also
 Norway in 1814

References

External links 
 Georg Sverdrups hus – Universitetsbibliotekets
 Georg Sverdrup, eidsvollsmann (Eidsvoll  1814)

1770 births
1850 deaths
Norwegian philologists
Norwegian librarians
Academic staff of the University of Oslo
Fathers of the Constitution of Norway
Members of the Storting
Presidents of the Storting
Politicians from Oslo
University of Copenhagen alumni
People from Nærøy